Compartmentalization in structures, such as land-based buildings, traffic tunnels, ships, aerospace vehicles, or submarines, is the fundamental basis and aim of passive fire protection.

The idea is to divide a structure into "fire compartments", which may contain single or multiple rooms, for the purpose of limiting the spread of fire, smoke and flue gases, in order to enable the three goals of fire protection:
life safety
property protection
continuity of operations

The construction of such compartments and all their components is a matter of systems within systems, which use bounding to achieve fire-resistance ratings, all interdependent, forming part of an overall fire safety plan. All components forming part of such a compartment are subject to stringent bounding in countries, where product certification is mandatory.

See also
Bulkhead (partition)

External links
Wisegeek.com article on fire compartments
Province of Alberta Code Interpretation Concerning Fire Compartments
National Research Council of Canada, Institute for Research in Construction Article entitled Fire Compartmentation and Fire Resistance
Article by William E. Koffel entitled Fire compartments and building height

Passive fire protection